Peter Bryan Sidgreaves is an Australian politician. He has been a member of the New South Wales Legislative Assembly since 2019, representing Camden for the Liberal Party.

At the time of his election, Sidgreaves was serving as Mayor of Camden Council, having been first elected to the council in 2012.

References

 

Year of birth missing (living people)
Living people
Liberal Party of Australia members of the Parliament of New South Wales
Members of the New South Wales Legislative Assembly
21st-century Australian politicians